O Canto da Cidade – 15 Anos is a box released in 2008 by Brazilian singer Daniela Mercury. Contains a remastered version of the CD O Canto da Cidade, originally released in 1992, and a DVD with the TV special directed by Roberto Talma which was presented by the Rede Globo in the end of the same year.

Track listing

External links 
About the album in Mercury's official website
[ A review of the album] at Allmusic

1992 compilation albums
Daniela Mercury albums
Albums produced by Liminha